37th Signal Regiment (37 Sig Regt) is a military communications regiment of the Royal Corps of Signals, part of the British Army.  The regiment was one of ten Territorial Army, (Army Reserve from 2015), units formed following the complete reorganisation of the Territorial Army in 1967.  Until the Army 2020 programme in 2012, the regiment provided national communications support and its squadrons providing support to the regional brigades, notable 143rd (West Midlands) and 160th (Welsh) Brigades.  However, from 2014 the regiment was re-roled and now paired with 2nd Signal Regiment supporting 1st (United Kingdom) Division.

History
The regiment was formed as the 37th (Wessex and Welsh) Signal Regiment, Royal Signals (Volunteers) in 1967. It initially consisted of 43 (Wessex) Signal Squadron, 53 (Welsh) Signal Squadron and 57 (City & County of Bristol) Signal Squadron. In 1969 67 (Queen's Own Warwickshire and Worcestershire Yeomanry) Signal Squadron joined the regiment.

In 1992, under Options for Change, 43 (Wessex) Squadron transferred to 21st (Air Support) Signal Regiment, 57 (City and County of Bristol) Squadron transferred to 71 Signal Regiment and 93 (East Lancashire) Squadron transferred from 38 Signal Regiment.  In addition to squadron changes, the regimental title was changed when the regiment dropped the 'Wessex and Welsh' subtitle following the above changes.  Therefore, it became known as the 37th Signal Regiment.

In 2006, 93 (East Lancashire) Squadron transferred back to 38 Signal Regiment.

In 2009, under a further re-organisation, 67 (Queen's Own Warwickshire and Worcestershire Yeomanry) Squadron was reduced to a troop (867 Troop) and 48 (City of Birmingham) Squadron joined the regiment on the disbandment of 35 (South Midlands) Signal Regiment. At the same time 33 (Lancashire) Squadron was formed on the disbandment of 33 (Lancashire and Cheshire) Signal Regiment.

In 2014, under Army 2020, 53 (Welsh) Signal Squadron transferred to 39 (Skinners) Signal Regiment.

Current structure
The current structure of the regiment is as follows.

 Regimental Headquarters, in Redditch
The Royal Signals (Northern) Band, at Bradford Armoury, Darlington
 33 (Lancashire and Cheshire) Signal Squadron, in Liverpool
 842 (City of Manchester) Signal Troop, in Manchester
 880 (Cheshire Yeomanry (Earl of Chester's)) Signal Troop
 893 (East Lancashire) Signal Troop
 48 (City of Birmingham) Signal Squadron, in Birmingham
 896 (City of Coventry) Signal Troop, in Coventry
 897 Signal Troop
 898 (Staffordshire) Signal Troop, at Beacon Barracks, Stafford
 50 (Northern) Signal Squadron, in Darlington
 834 (Northern) Signal Troop
 875 (City of Durham) Signal Troop
 Kohima Troop, at Imphal Barracks, York
 64 (City of Sheffield) Signal Squadron, in Sheffield
 849 (City of Leeds) Signal Troop, in Leeds
 864 (City of Sheffield) Signal Troop
 887 (City of Nottingham) Signal Troop, in Nottingham
 54 (Queen's Own Warwickshire and Worcestershire Yeomanry) Support Squadron, in Redditch
 867 (Capability Development) Signal Troop

See also

 Units of the Royal Corps of Signals

References

External links 
 37 Signal Regiment - on British Army official website

Regiments of the Royal Corps of Signals

Military units and formations established in 1967
Military units and formations in Worcestershire